Culoz ( or ) is a former commune in the Ain department in the Auvergne-Rhône-Alpes region of France. On 1 January 2023, it was merged into the new commune of Culoz-Béon.

Geography
The town, which is situated on the right bank of the River Rhône just a few kilometres from the first foothills of the Alps, is dominated by the Grand Colombier: the highest summit of the southern end of the Jura mountain range.

Culoz lies on the D904 road close to the point at which it crosses the D992 and is also an important railway junction: Culoz railway station is served by lines to Geneva, Bellegarde-sur-Valserine, Évian-les-Bains, Aix-les-Bains, Bourg-Saint-Maurice, Lyon, and Paris.

Personalities
Henry Dunant, Nobel Peace Prize winner, 1901, was one of the founders of the Red Cross
The surgeon Antonin Poncet, who died in Culoz in 1951
Brothers Henry and Léon Serpollet, steam engineers
Christophe Lemaitre, sprinter, European champion.

Population

See also
Communes of the Ain department

References

External links

  The history of Culoz (plain text)
  Official Culoz website
  Tourism Office
  Gazetteer Entry

Former communes of Ain
Ain communes articles needing translation from French Wikipedia